Spinosa may refer to:
 Tony Spinosa (born 1960), a director, choreographer and actor
 Viviana Spinosa (born 1984), Colombian digital artist
  (born 1963), French director and screenwriter

Species Latin names
Spinosa, spiny in Latin, may refer to the following species :
 Bristowia heterospinosa, a jumping spider species found in Asia

See also
 Spinoza (disambiguation)
 Espinoza (disambiguation)

Italian-language surnames